Hysteric Blue was a Japanese rock band formed in Osaka, Japan in 1997 and disbanded in 2004. During the course of their musical career they released a total of 14 singles, five studio albums, one compilation album, three video compilations, one DVD and 16 music videos.

They are known for anime fans as the band who provided the opening theme for the anime series Ghost Stories, the opening theme for Vampiyan Kids and the ending theme of Spiral ~Suiri no Kizuna~.

The band broke up after Guitarist Naoki Akamatsu was convicted of nine counts of rape and sentenced to 14 years of prison. Vocalist Tama and drummer Takuya then started a new band, The Screaming Frogs.

Discography

Singles 
RUSH! (1998-10-31)
Haru ~spring~ (春～spring～) (1999-1-21)
Little Trip (1999-5-8)
Naze... (なぜ...) (1999-7-28)
Futari Bocchi (ふたりぼっち) (1999-10-22)
Chokkan Paradise (直感パラダイス) (2000-1-26)
Dear (2000-3-29)
Grow Up (グロウアップ) (2000-10-25)
Daisuki (だいすき) (2000-11-22)
Reset me (2001-8-22)
Frustration Music (フラストレーション ミュージック) (2001-10-24)
Bayside Baby (ベイサイドベイビー) (2002-1-23)
Home Town (2002-11-7)
DOLCE ~Natsuiro Renbo~ (DOLCE～夏色恋慕～) (2003-6-18)

Albums 
 Baby Blue (1999-4-1)
 WALLABY (2000-2-23)
 Bleu-Bleu-Bleu (2001-1-24)
 MILESTONE (2002-2-20)
 JUNCTION (2003-8-6)

Compilations 
 Historic Blue (2002-11-20)

Video Compilations 
 Baby Clips 1
 Baby Clips 2
 Baby Clips 3

DVD 
 Historic Blue Films

References 

Japanese rock music groups
Japanese pop rock music groups
Musical groups from Osaka
Musical groups established in 1997
Musical groups disestablished in 2004
1997 establishments in Japan
2004 disestablishments in Japan